Culmin's Ghost Appears to his Mother is an oil on canvas painting of 1794 by the Danish neoclassical artist Nicolai Abildgaard. It depicts a scene from the Ossian poetry cycle.

References

1794 paintings
Paintings in the collection of the Nationalmuseum Stockholm
Danish paintings